Eucalyptus pilligaensis, commonly known as the Pilliga box or narrow-leaved box, is a species of eucalypt native to eastern Australia.

Taxonomy
Eucalyptus pilligaensis was first formally described in 1920 by Joseph Maiden in Journal and Proceedings of the Royal Society of New South Wales. It is regarded as a synonym of Eucalyptus woollsiana by the Australian Plant Census.

References

pilligaensis
Flora of Queensland
Drought-tolerant trees
Myrtales of Australia
Plants described in 1914